Christopher or Chris Buckley may refer to:

 Christopher Buckley (novelist) (born 1952), American political satirist
 Christopher Buckley (poet) (born 1948), American poet
 Christopher Buckley (journalist) (1905–1950), British journalist and historian
 Chris Buckley (footballer) (1886–1973), English football player
 Christopher Augustine Buckley (1845–1922), American political boss